HMS Lancaster was a 64-gun third-rate ship of the line of the Royal Navy, launched on 29 January 1797 at Rotherhithe. She was designed and built as the East Indiaman Pigot for the British East India Company, but the Navy purchased her on the stocks because of a shortage of naval vessels to prosecute the French Revolutionary Wars.

Career
They remained until October and during this period shared in the proceeds of several captures.
 Spanish ship Edouard (August). This vessel may actually have been a French ship of 300 tons (bm), carrying naval stores, wine, brandy, and the like from Bordeaux to Isle de France.
 French brig Paquebot (August). She had been sailing from Isle de France to Bourbon with a cargo of wine and goods from India.
 Spanish brig Numero Sete (August). Numero Septo had been sailing from Montevideo to Isle de France with a cargo of soap, tallow, candles, and provisions. 
 French brig Mouche and part of the cargo and materials from the wreck of the brig Uranie (September).

On 29 August 1806 Lancaster sailed from Simon's Bay as escort to a number of transports, including , as part of the unsuccessful second British invasion of the River Plate.

Fate
On 11 March 1815, the Navy converted Lancaster to a storage hulk. The Principal Officers and Commissioners of His Majesty's Navy offered her for sale on 30 May 1832 at Woolwich. She sold on that day to Christall & Co., London, for breaking up.

Citations and references
Citations

References

 Government of the Cape Colony (1899) Records of the Cape Colony from February 1793.
 
 
 Lavery, Brian (2003) The Ship of the Line - Volume 1: The development of the battlefleet 1650–1850. Conway Maritime Press. .

External links

Ships of the line of the Royal Navy
1797 ships
Ships of the British East India Company